Raj Kumar Chauhan (born 27 March 1957) is an Indian politician from the Indian National Congress party and was elected to Delhi Legislative Assembly from Mangol Puri constituency in First, Second, Third and Fourth Delhi Assembly. He was the Minister of Education and Social Welfare from December 2001 to December 2003. He also served as the Minister of Development, Revenue, Irrigation & Flood Control Department, Public Works Department, SC/ST Welfare Department in Second and Third Sheila Dikshit cabinet.

Electoral performance

References

External links
 https://www.facebook.com/RajkumarChauhanCongress/
https://www.instagram.com/rajkumarchauhancongress/?hl=en

Living people
Indian National Congress politicians from Delhi
United Progressive Alliance candidates in the 2019 Indian general election
1957 births